La Favorita:  1953 (A film of Gaetano Donizetti's opera La Favorite featuring a very young Sofia Lazzaro--Sophia Loren)

Rita: (based on Gaetano Donizetti's opera of the same name)

"Der Liebestrank", Komische Oper von Gaetano Donizetti (a film of L'elisir d'amore)
 Carmen: A Hip Hopera (based on Carmen by Georges Bizet)
 Carmen Jones (based on Carmen by Georges Bizet)
 M. Butterfly (based on Madama Butterfly by Giacomo Puccini)
 Prénom Carmen (based on Carmen by Georges Bizet)
 Rent (based on La bohème by Giacomo Puccini)
 The Toll of the Sea (based on Madama Butterfly by Giacomo Puccini)
 U-Carmen e-Khayelitsha (based on Carmen by Georges Bizet)
 Camille (1936 film) and "Moulin Rouge" (based on La Traviata by Verdi)
 Rick (2003 film) (based on Rigoletto by Verdi)
 A Time of Destiny (1988 film) (based on La Forza del Destino by Verdi)
This is a list of opera films. 
 Don Giovanni, 1979 (Don Giovanni by Wolfgang Amadeus Mozart), directed by Joseph Losey
 The Magic Flute, 1975 (The Magic Flute by Wolfgang Amadeus Mozart), directed by Ingmar Bergman
 La traviata, 1983 (La traviata by Giuseppe Verdi), directed by Franco Zeffirelli
 Giuseppe Verdi's Rigoletto Story (Rigoletto by Giuseppe Verdi)
 The Magic Flute, 2006 (The Magic Flute by Wolfgang Amadeus Mozart), directed by Kenneth Branagh
 Parsifal
 Das Rheingold, 1978, directed by Ernst Wild
 Prince Igor, 1970, directed by Roman Tikhomirov
 Boris Godunov, 1954, directed by Vera Stroyeva
 Moses und Aron
 The Tales of Hoffmann, directed by Michael Powell and Emeric Pressburger
 Carmen, 1984, directed by Francesco Rosi
 Aria
 Il barbiere di Siviglia, 1946, directed by Mario Costa, with Tito Gobbi
 The Dumb Girl of Portici, 1916, directed by Lois Weber and Phillips Smalley
 Das Rheingold, 1995 [from the Operavox animated series]
 Porgy and Bess, 1959, directed by Otto Preminger
 La Bohème, 1988, directed by Luigi Comencini, with Barbara Hendricks
 Otello, 1986, directed by Franco Zeffirelli
 Cavalleria rusticana, 1953
 The Death of Klinghoffer, 2003, directed by Penny Woolcock
 The Bohemian Girl, 1927
 Katerina Izmailova, 1966, directed by Mikhail Shapiro, with Galina Vishnevskaya
 Louise, 1939, directed by Abel Gance, with Grace Moore
 Topsy-Turvy, 1999, directed by Mike Leigh
 Bánk bán, 2001

References

Opera-related lists
Operas